Young Pirates is a youth wing of Czech Pirate Party. It was founded in 2013 by Vojtěch Pikal.

History
Young Pirates was formally founded in 2013. The organisation hasn't been very active because many potential members have decided to join the Czech Pirate Party instead.

References

External links
Official Website

Czech Pirate Party
2013 establishments in the Czech Republic
Youth wings of political parties in the Czech Republic